Kabompo is a constituency of the National Assembly of Zambia. It covers the towns of Chikonkwelo, Chilikita, Kabompo, Kabulamena, Kayombo, Mumbeji, Samiyengo and Shindola in Kabompo District of North-Western Province.

List of MPs

References

Constituencies of the National Assembly of Zambia
Constituencies established in 1962
1962 establishments in Northern Rhodesia